Siderolamprus orobius is a species of lizard of the Diploglossidae family. It is found in Costa Rica.

It was formerly classified in the genus Celestus, but was moved to Siderolamprus in 2021.

References

Siderolamprus
Reptiles described in 1993
Reptiles of Costa Rica
Endemic fauna of Costa Rica